The  is a museum and educational center operated by Japan Airlines to promote airline safety. The center estimates that its facility is within five minutes walking distance from the Tokyo Monorail Seibijō Station.

A major objective of the Safety Promotion Center is to establish safety awareness among JAL Group staff.  The main exhibits of the center explain the events leading to the crash of Japan Airlines Flight 123, which used a Boeing 747.

History
On August 12, 1985, Japan Airlines Flight 123, a flight from Tokyo International Airport (informally called Haneda Airport) to Osaka International Airport (also known as Itami Airport), crashed into Mount Takamagahara.  The accident was the deadliest involving a single aircraft.  The crash was eventually attributed to an improper repair in the rear bulkhead several years earlier, leading to catastrophic structural failure.

A five-member panel of external safety experts was established by Japan Airlines in 2005, the 20th anniversary of JAL 123 crash, to brainstorm ideas to prevent future air disasters. Chaired by Kunio Yanagida, a well-known writer specializing in scientific, aviation, and crisis management topics, the panel recommended the creation of the center.

The center opened on April 24, 2006. Yutaka Kanasaki is the director. One of the main objectives of the center is to establish safety awareness among Japan Airlines employees.

Despite its lack of publicity, the center receives more than 80 visitors every weekday.

Location
The center is located in an unmarked office building in the maintenance district near Haneda Airport, near the Shin Seibijō Station on the Tokyo Monorail Haneda Airport Line. It is open to the public, but reservations are necessary.

Exhibits
Wreckage from the aft fuselage, the cockpit voice recorder, newspaper reports of the accident, and photographs of the crash site are on display at the center. Owing to the amount of time the aircraft remained in the air after being crippled, a number of passengers chose to write farewell letters. Some of these letters are also on display.  The center also has displays about other Japan Airlines accidents, as well as other historical aviation accidents.  The center occupies  of floor space.

Influence on US Airways Flight 1549 "Miracle on the Hudson" exhibit
The center's "time-line" display of other historical aviation accidents since the crash of JAL 123 helped inspire the Carolinas Aviation Museum's effort to save and display the aircraft involved in US Airways Flight 1549, the Airbus A320 which Capt. Chesley Sullenberger landed in New York's Hudson River on January 15, 2009.

References

External links

Safety Promotion Center - Japan Airlines 
Safety Promotion Center - Japan Airlines 

Museums in Tokyo
Aerospace museums in Japan
Museums established in 2006
Ōta, Tokyo
2006 establishments in Japan